The 2018 Norwich City Council election took on 3 May 2018 to elect members of Norwich City Council in England. This was on the same day as other local elections. 13 of 39 seats (one-third) were up for election.

The Labour Party retained overall control of the council, winning 12 out of 13 seats up for election and 49% of the vote, their best result in over 20 years. The Greens lost every seat they were defending, whilst the Liberal Democrats retained their single seat in Eaton ward. The Conservatives once again failed to elect any councillors, although they did increase their share of the vote by 3 percentage points. As of the 2018 election, the Conservatives have not won a seat on Norwich City Council for over 10 years.

All changes in vote share are calculated with reference to the 2014 election, the last time these seats were contested.

Background

In the 2016 election, the Labour Party achieved its best result in the city since 1998, winning 44% of the vote and 11 of 13 seats up for election, with the Greens dropping to their worst percentage result since 2005 (21%) and losing 4 of the 5 seats they were defending. The scale of the Labour victory was reported to have surprised both Labour and the Green Party and was partly attributed to Jeremy Corbyn's leadership of the Labour Party bringing "some voters who had previously switched to the Greens back to Labour".

The following year, in the Norfolk County Council election, Labour bucked its national trend of poor results and gained 4 seats in Norwich, all from the Green Party, leaving the Greens with no representation on the County Council for the first time since 2001. This was followed by a general election on 8 June, which saw Labour win Norwich South with 61% of the vote, with the Green Party candidate achieving a total of 3%. Labour also came within 507 votes of winning Norwich North from the Conservative Party.

Overall result

|-bgcolor=#F6F6F6
| colspan=2 style="text-align: right; margin-right: 1em" | Total
| style="text-align: right;" | 13
| colspan=4 style="text-align: right;" |
| style="text-align: right;" | 
| style="text-align: right;" | 34,773
| style="text-align: right;" | 
|-
|}

Changes in vote share are relative to the last time these seats were contested in 2014.

Council Composition

Prior to the election the composition of the council was:

After the election the composition of the council was:

Ward Results

Bowthorpe

Catton Grove

Crome

Eaton

Lakenham

Mancroft

Mile Cross

Nelson

Sewell

Thorpe Hamlet

Town Close

University

Wensum

References

2018 English local elections
2018
2010s in Norfolk